Macario Against Zagomar (Italian: Macario contro Zagomar; also known as Macario Against Fantomas) is a 1944 Italian comedy film directed by Giorgio Ferroni and starring Erminio Macario.

Plot
In Paris, the dreaded Zagomar kidnapped the daughter of a scientist to force him to deliver his latest discovery: a machine that "blocks" over time. Macario, the assistant teacher, decides to confront this elusive bandit that lurks in the bowels of the city.

Cast
 Erminio Macario as Macario Duplessis
 Nino Crisman as Zagomar
 Gero Zambuto as Professor Moreau
 Nada Fiorelli as Mirella Moreau
 Olga Villi as Annette
 Carlo Rizzo as Fandors, journalist

Production
The film was made during World War II and should have been entitled "'Macario Against Fantomas'" but producers never acquired the rights to do so. To resolve the issue Vittorio Metz created the character of "Zagomar" a master villain modeled on "Fantomas".

Notes

External links
 

1944 films
1940s Italian-language films
1940s parody films
Italian black-and-white films
Films directed by Giorgio Ferroni
Italian parody films
Italian comedy films
1944 comedy films
1940s Italian films